Telfer is a minesite and company town in the Pilbara region of Western Australia, within the Great Sandy Desert. The gold, copper, and silver mine is run by Newcrest Mining, and is one of the largest gold mines in Australia.

History

Newmont Mining first made a claim to the deposit in 1972; however, this is disputed by Jean-Paul Turcaud to this date.

A company town to support the mine was built by Newmont in 1976 and named after  Telfer, former Western Australian Under Secretary for Mines. The town grew to a peak of almost 1,000 inhabitants in the early 1990s, with services such as a supermarket, a police station, a bank, a community hall, a library and a number of sporting facilities being available.

The mine opened in 1977 as a joint venture between BHP and Newmont Mining. In 1990, a merger between Newmont Australia Limited and BHP Gold Limited resulted in the creation of Newcrest Mining, with ownership of the Telfer mine lying with Newcrest.

Telfer's demographic characteristics were typical of a northern Western Australian mining town in the time period. It had a male to female ratio of 2.4 to 1 and almost 40 percent of its population was born overseas. Half its population was below the age of 35 and the town experienced an annual population turnover of almost 20 percent.

In 1996, the town suffered from the decision to move the Telfer mine from residential to a fly-in fly-out workforce. Many of the commercial services were withdrawn; only the recreational facilities were maintained. The existing housing was now used for the accommodation of the mine's mobile work force. One of the main reasons for the town's closure was that fly-in fly-out rosters gave the mine access to a larger skilled work force and to people that would otherwise have been unwilling to relocate to a remote location like Telfer.

Open-cut mining was suspended in August 2000 due to high operating costs. High production costs were primarily caused by the presence of cyanide soluble copper in the open pit ore.

The mine reopened in November 2004, after commissioning of the processing plant and, initially as an open cut mine, from March 2006 also with an underground operation.

In July 2018, a woman on her lunch break at the Telfer Mine was attacked by a dingo. The injuries required surgery.

Climate
Telfer has a hot arid climate (Köppen BWh) with sweltering summers and very warm winters. Telfer's location near the hot Indian Ocean leaves the community vulnerable to tropical cyclones. For example, Cyclone Graham affected the area in early 2003, delivering  of rain. Severe Tropical Cyclone Laurence also passed over the mine site in December 2009.

References

Further reading
 Garrick Moore: Mining towns of Western Australia, published: 1997, 

Mining towns in Western Australia
Great Sandy Desert
Shire of East Pilbara